Yeh Tzu-cheng (born 22 November 1987) is a Taiwanese swimmer, who specialized in butterfly events. Yeh qualified for the men's 200 m butterfly at the 2004 Summer Olympics in Athens, by posting a FINA B-standard entry time of 2:03.28 from the National University Games in Taipei. He challenged seven other swimmers in heat two, including four-time Olympian Vladan Marković of Serbia and Montenegro. He rounded out the field to last place by a 6.39-second margin behind winner Nathaniel O'Brien of Canada in 2:06.41. Yeh failed to advance into the semifinals, as he placed thirty-sixth overall in the preliminaries.

References

1987 births
Living people
Taiwanese male swimmers
Olympic swimmers of Taiwan
Swimmers at the 2004 Summer Olympics
Male butterfly swimmers